Gilles Vigne (born 14 March 1950) is a French former freestyle swimmer. He competed in two events at the 1972 Summer Olympics.

References

External links
 

1950 births
Living people
French male freestyle swimmers
Olympic swimmers of France
Swimmers at the 1972 Summer Olympics
Place of birth missing (living people)